Madeeha Gauhar (21 September 1956 – 25 April 2018) was a Pakistani TV and stage actress, playwright and director of social theater, and women's rights activist. In 1984, she founded Ajoka Theatre where social themes were staged in theaters, on the street and in public places. With Ajoka Theater, she performed in Asia and Europe. She was one of the leading actress of Pakistan's Television screens in 1970s, 1980s and 1990s.

Early life and career
Madeeha Gauhar was born in 1956 in Karachi, Pakistan. After obtaining a Master of Arts degree in English literature, she moved to England where she obtained another master's degree, studying theater science at the University of London.

In 1983, with her studies completed, she returned to her native country, settling in Lahore. She was involved in the Women's March on 12 February when she and other protested against the regime. She was photographed being pushed back by a police officer.

Gauhar and her husband Shahid Nadeem founded Ajoka Theatre in 1984, a notable theater group of significance in the city. Ajoka (English:) elaborates on the oral tradition of Bhand and Nautanki and found a flourishing base in the area that overlaps the province of Punjab. Despite her educational background in the UK and China, Gauhar did not restrict herself to conventional classical Western theater techniques. Rather, she aimed to incorporate authentic Pakistani elements with contemporary sentiments. With Ajoka, Gauhar performed in Pakistan, and subsequently in many other countries. The troupe performed in the region such as India, Bangladesh, Nepal and Sri Lanka, as well as in several countries in Europe.

The most important motive of the shows, according to Gauhar, is the promotion of a just, humane, secular and equal society. She directed almost 36 plays which were performed in Pakistan as well as in other Asian countries. In directing performances in the theater, Gauhar utilised aesthetics and theatrical techniques to reflect the moral, social and political reality of contemporary Pakistan. A recurrent theme for her, as a feminist, was the subject of women's rights in a society that is greatly dominated by men.

In 2006, she was honored with a Prince Claus Award from the Netherlands. In 2007 she won the International Theatre Pasta Award.

In 2007, Ajoka performed a play that was written and directed by Gauhar, the Burqavaganza (Burqa-vaganza), which led to great controversy. Actors dressed in burkas acted out themes of sexual discrimination, intolerance and fanaticism. From a Western perspective, the piece was a rather innocent performance on hypocrisy of a society that bathes in corruption. In her own country, though, Members of Parliament called for a ban of the performance, and the Minister of Culture threatened with sanctions, if the stage play continued. The ban on the stage play was finally imposed as threatened, but the non-governmental organizations and women's rights activists had the play translated into English and did staged performances internationally as an sign of support to Ajoka.

Major plays
 Toba Tek Singh based on Saadat Hasan Manto's short story
 Ek Thi Nani
 Bulha on Bulleh Shah's life
 Letters to Uncle Sam
 Hotel Mohenjodaro
 Lo Phir Basant Ayee

Death and legacy
Madeeha Gauhar died in Lahore, Pakistan, on 25 April 2018 at the age of 61 after a three-year illness with cancer. Madeeha Gauhar tried to promote peace between India and Pakistan and tirelessly campaigned for it. She also was widely considered as one of Pakistan's leading women's rights activists. Madeeha Gauhar's Ajoka Theater's plays were frequently based on social and human rights issues - for example female literacy, honour killings, religious extremism.

Filmography

Television series

Awards and nominations
Madeeha Gauhar received numerous awards for her theatrical efforts, including:
 At the first iteration of the 1st Indus Drama Awards in 2005, she was nominated for Best Actress Drama Serial in a Supporting Role.
 Madeeha Gauhar was nominated for the Nobel Peace Prize in 2005.
 In 2006, Gauhar was awarded Prince Claus Award in the Netherlands
 Tamgha-i-Imtiaz (Medal of Distinction), awarded to her by the President of Pakistan in 2003 for her efforts in improving Pakistani theatre.
Fatima Jinnah Award by the Government of Pakistan in 2014

See also 

 National Women's Day (Pakistan)

References

External links
 

1956 births
20th-century Pakistani actresses
Pakistani television actresses
Pakistani women's rights activists
Pakistani stage actresses
Pakistani theatre directors
21st-century Pakistani actresses
Pakistani dramatists and playwrights
2018 deaths
Actresses from Karachi
Deaths from cancer in Pakistan
Recipients of Tamgha-e-Imtiaz